Jeremy Kimball, (born March 1, 1991) is an American mixed martial arts fighter who formerly competed in the Light Heavyweight division of the Ultimate Fighting Championship. A professional competitor since 2010, Kimball has also formerly competed for Bellator MMA and the RFA.

Background
Kimball was born in Burlington, Vermont but raised in Colorado Springs, Colorado, attending Doherty High School. Kimball began training at the age of eight, under the tutelage of his father Ernest, an MMA coach.

Mixed martial arts career

Ultimate Fighting Championship
Kimball made his promotional debut on January 28, 2017 against Marcos Rogério de Lima at UFC on Fox: Shevchenko vs. Peña. He lost via TKO in the first round.

Kimball faced Josh Stansbury on June 25, 2017 at UFC Fight Night 112. He won the fight in the first round via TKO. The win also earned Kimball his first Performance of the Night bonus award.

Kimball faced Dominick Reyes on December 2, 2017 at UFC 218. He lost the fight via submission in the first round.

Kimball faced promotional newcomer Darko Stošić on July 22, 2018 at UFC Fight Night: Shogun vs. Smith. He lost the fight via technical knockout.

Oktagon MMA 
Kimball faced Thomas Narmo on April 9, 2022 against Thomas Narmo at Oktagon 32. He won the bout via TKO in the first round after Narmo was unable to continue due to leg kicks.

Kimball faced Hatef Moeil on October 15, 2022 at Oktagon 36. He lost the bout via TKO stoppage due to ground and pound in the second round.

Championships and accomplishments

Mixed martial arts
 Final Fight Championship 
 FFC Light Heavyweight Championship (One time; current)
Ultimate Fighting Championship
Performance of the Night (One time) vs. Josh Stansbury

Mixed martial arts record 

|-
|Loss
|align=center|18–10
|Hatef Moeil
|TKO (knees and punches)
|Oktagon 36
|
|align=center|2
|align=center|1:04
|Frankfurt, Germany
|
|-
|Win
|align=center|18–9
|Thomas Narmo
|TKO (leg kicks)
|Oktagon 32
|
|align=center|1
|align=center|2:58
|Ostrava, Czech Republic
|
|-
|Loss
|align=center|17–9
|Timo Feucht
|TKO (punches)
|Oktagon 14
|
|align=center|1
|align=center|2:01
|Ostrava, Czech Republic
|
|-
|Win
|align=center|17–8
|Miloš Petrášek
|Decision (unanimous) 
|Oktagon 11 
|
|align=center|3
|align=center|5:00
|Ostrava, Czech Republic
|
|-
|Win
|align=center|16–8
|Miloš Petrášek
|TKO (punches) 
|Oktagon 10 
|
|align=center|1
|align=center|4:27
|Prague, Czech Republic
|
|-
|Loss
|align=center|15–8
|Darko Stošić 
|TKO (elbows and punches)
|UFC Fight Night: Shogun vs. Smith 
|
|align=center|1
|align=center|3:13
|Hamburg, Germany
|
|-
|Loss
|align=center|15–7
|Dominick Reyes
|Submission (rear-naked choke)
|UFC 218 
|
|align=center|1
|align=center|3:39
|Detroit, Michigan, United States
|
|-
|Win
|align=center|15–6
|Josh Stansbury
|TKO (punches)
|UFC Fight Night: Chiesa vs. Lee
|
|align=center|1
|align=center|1:21
|Oklahoma City, Oklahoma, United States
|
|-
|Loss
|align=center|14–6
|Marcos Rogério de Lima
|TKO (punches)
|UFC on Fox: Shevchenko vs. Peña
|
|align=center|1
|align=center|2:27
|Denver, Colorado, United States
|
|-
|Win
|align=center|14–5
|Maro Perak
|TKO (punches)
|FFC 27: Night of Champions
|
|align=center|3
|align=center|4:44
|Zagreb, Croatia
|
|-
|Win
|align=center|13–5
|Matt Van Buren
|KO (punch)
|FFC 24: Villareas vs. Reis
|
|align=center|1
|align=center|0:14
|Daytona Beach, Florida, United States
| 
|-
|Win
|align=center|12–5
|Cody Mumma
|Decision (unanimous)
|RFA 34: Veličković vs. Smith 
|
|align=center|3
|align=center|5:00
|Broomfield, Colorado, United States
|
|-
|Win
|align=center|11–5
|Jason Clayton
|TKO (punches)
|TSE: Rocky Mountain Rubicon 1
|
|align=center|1
|align=center|0:22
|Pueblo, Colorado, United States
|
|-
|Loss
|align=center|10–5
|Chris Camozzi
|Submission (rear-naked choke)
|Prize FC 7: Rock N' Rumble 
|
|align=center|1
|align=center|3:33
|Denver, Colorado, United States
|
|-
|Loss
|align=center|10–4
|Perry Filkins
|Submission (rear-naked choke)
|Bellator 98
|
|align=center|3
|align=center|4:18
|Uncasville, Connecticut, United States
|
|-
|Win
|align=center|10–3
|Keith Berry
|KO (punches)
|Bellator 97
|
|align=center|2
|align=center|1:45
|Albuquerque, New Mexico, United States
|
|-
|Win
|align=center|9–3
|Chidi Njokuani
|Submission (rear-naked choke)
|RFA 7: Thatch vs. Rhodes
|
|align=center|2
|align=center|1:51
|Denver, Colorado, United States
|
|-
|Win
|align=center|8–3
|Drew McFedries
|Decision (unanimous)
|Prize FC 1: Paramount Prize Fighting 
|
|align=center|3
|align=center|5:00
|Denver, Colorado, United States
|
|-
|Win
|align=center|7–3
|Tom Speer
|TKO (punches)
|MFW: Made for War 1
|
|align=center|2
|align=center|2:29
|Castle Rock, Colorado, United States
|
|-
|Win
|align=center|6–3
|Richard Villa
|KO (punches)
|FBMMA 1: Colorado vs. New Mexico
|
|align=center|1
|align=center|0:58
|Pueblo, Colorado, United States
|
|-
|Win
|align=center|5–3
|Jason Lee
|TKO (punches)
|FTW: Paramount Prize Fighting 2012
|
|align=center|3
|align=center|2:07
|Denver, Colorado, United States
|
|-
|Loss
|align=center|4–3
|Donnie Liles
|Submission (inverted armbar)
|BTMMA 2: Genesis
|
|align=center|2
|align=center|4:09
|Pueblo, Colorado, United States
|
|-
|Win
|align=center|4–2
|Artenas Young
|Decision (split)
|SCR: Steel City Rumble 7
|
|align=center|3
|align=center|5:00
|Grand Junction, Colorado, United States
|
|-
|Win
|align=center|3–2
|Aaron Romero
|TKO (punches)
|FFFC: Full Force Fighting 1
|
|align=center|1
|align=center|0:54
|Denver, Colorado, United States
|
|-
|Win
|align=center|2–2
|Cruz Chacon
|KO (punch)
|RMBB: MMA Madness 3
|
|align=center|1
|align=center|0:38
|Sheridan, Colorado, United States
|
|-
|Win
|align=center|1–2
|Vinnie Lopez
|KO (punch)
|SCR: Steel City Rumble 6
|
|align=center|1
|align=center|0:58
|Pueblo, Colorado, United States
|
|-
|Loss
|align=center|0–2
|Chad Klingensmith
|Submission (rear-naked choke)
|FTW/KOC: 
|
|align=center|1
|align=center|1:36
|Denver, Colorado, United States
|
|-
|Loss
|align=center|0–1
|Kenneth Seegrist
|Submission (rear-naked choke)
|FTW: Phenoms
|
|align=center|1
|align=center|1:27
|Denver, Colorado, United States
|

See also
 List of current UFC fighters
 List of Bellator MMA alumni
 List of male mixed martial artists

References

External links
 
 

American male mixed martial artists
1991 births
Living people
Light heavyweight mixed martial artists
Mixed martial artists from Vermont
People from Burlington, Vermont
Ultimate Fighting Championship male fighters